Elections to Down District Council were held on 5 May 2005 on the same day as the other Northern Irish local government elections. The election used four district electoral areas to elect a total of 23 councillors.

Election results

Note: "Votes" are the first preference votes.

Districts summary

|- class="unsortable" align="centre"
!rowspan=2 align="left"|Ward
! % 
!Cllrs
! % 
!Cllrs
! %
!Cllrs
! %
!Cllrs
! % 
!Cllrs
! % 
!Cllrs
!rowspan=2|TotalCllrs
|- class="unsortable" align="center"
!colspan=2 bgcolor="" | SDLP
!colspan=2 bgcolor="" | Sinn Féin
!colspan=2 bgcolor="" | UUP
!colspan=2 bgcolor="" | DUP
!colspan=2 bgcolor="" | Green
!colspan=2 bgcolor="white"| Others
|-
|align="left"|Ballynahinch
|bgcolor="#99FF66"|33.3
|bgcolor="#99FF66"|2
|19.9
|1
|19.9
|1
|26.8
|1
|0.0
|0
|0.0
|0
|5
|-
|align="left"|Downpatrick
|bgcolor="#99FF66"|50.7
|bgcolor="#99FF66"|4
|32.2
|2
|8.5
|0
|0.0
|0
|7.4
|1
|1.2
|0
|7
|-
|align="left"|Newcastle
|bgcolor="#99FF66"|40.4
|bgcolor="#99FF66"|3
|32.3
|2
|11.3
|1
|10.4
|0
|2.1
|0
|3.5
|0
|6
|-
|align="left"|Rowallane
|22.3
|1
|4.9
|0
|32.3
|2
|bgcolor="#D46A4C"|32.3
|bgcolor="#D46A4C"|2
|2.9
|0
|5.3
|0
|5
|- class="unsortable" class="sortbottom" style="background:#C9C9C9"
|align="left"| Total
|37.5
|10
|23.1
|5
|17.3
|4
|16.3
|3
|3.3
|1
|2.5
|0
|23
|-
|}

Districts results

Ballynahinch

2001: 2 x SDLP, 1 x DUP, 1 x Sinn Féin, 1 x UUP
2005: 2 x SDLP, 1 x DUP, 1 x Sinn Féin, 1 x UUP
2001-2005 Change: No change

Downpatrick

2001: 4 x SDLP, 1 x Sinn Féin, 1 x UUP, 1 x Independent
2005: 4 x SDLP, 2 x Sinn Féin, 1 x Green
2001-2005 Change: Sinn Féin and Green gain from UUP and Independent

Newcastle

2001: 3 x SDLP, 2 x Sinn Féin, 1 x UUP
2005: 3 x SDLP, 2 x Sinn Féin, 1 x UUP
2001-2005 Change: No change

Rowallane

2001: 3 x UUP, 1 x DUP, 1 x SDLP
2005: 2 x UUP, 2 x DUP, 1 x SDLP
2001-2005 Change: DUP gain from UUP

References

Down District Council elections
Down